Frances Maloney may be a misspelling of:
 Frances Moloney (1873–1959), Irish socialite, later Sister Mary Patrick of the Missionary Sisters of St. Columban 
 Francis Maloney (disambiguation) various people